The 88th New York Infantry Regiment was a volunteer regiment in the Union Army's Irish Brigade during the American Civil War.

History

1861
The regiment was mustered into service in the autumn of 1861 at Fort Schuyler in New York when the government approved the commissioning of an Irish Brigade. Its men were gathered in the states of New York and New Jersey from the various Irish masses of those states.

In the beginning, the 88th was not one regiment, but two. One regiment was originally the 2nd New York Infantry, the other, the 4th, respectively under command of a Colonel Baker and Colonel Thomas F. Meagher, future commander of the entire brigade. The two colonels finally reached an agreement that the two regiments should be combined into one.

When the issue arose of what number the regiment would be given, many arguments began over it. The men eventually settled on the number 88, in honor of the British Army's 88th Connaught Rangers, a unit composed of Irishmen, also where many of the now American troops received their training.

In December of that year, the unit left Fort Schuyler for Virginia. At the time of departure, the unit contained 880 men and officers. Once in Virginia, they made camp for the winter until the next year.

1862
In 1862, the 88th officially joined the Army of the Potomac and fought in the Seven Days Battles, Antietam, and Fredericksburg.

Seven Days Battles
The 88th fought at the battles of Gaines Mill, Glendale, Savage's Station, and Malvern Hill during the Seven Days Battles in Virginia.

Antietam
At the Battle of Antietam, the Irish Brigade was one of the many brigades to charge the famous "Bloody Lane," a road that was sunken down into the ground over years of use, now held by two Confederate brigades. The whole Irish Brigade was armed that day with M1842 .69 caliber smoothbore muskets loaded with buck and ball. The Irish Brigade did
not break the Confederate line at the Bloody Lane, but fired round after round of the deadly buck-and-ball into the Confederate troops until exhausting their ammunition. The 88th and the rest of the Irish Brigade suffered 60% casualties that day.

Fredericksburg
Again, the 88th New York and the Irish Brigade would storm a heavily fortified position, this time being the hills above Fredericksburg, VA, known as Marye's Heights. The brigade was led forward by Brig. Gen. Thomas Meagher and sent forth upon the Confederate works. The 88th and their fellow Irishmen were some of the men that made it closest to their objective of the Confederate works. The 88th and the brigade were sent reeling back down the hill under unspeakably devastating artillery and small-arms fire. The Battle of Fredericksburg was again a grim day for the 88th. They suffered dozens upon dozens of casualties.

1863
By 1863, the regiments numbers had greatly decreased. The men had gone from nearly 900 men to about 50 in only two years.

Gettysburg
At Gettysburg, the 88th fought with the rest of the Irish Brigade, at that time under the command of Patrick Kelly in John C. Caldwell's division of Winfield Scott Hancock's II Corps. On the second day of battle, General Hancock ordered Caldwell's division to reinforce General Daniel Sickles's III Corps at the Wheatfield, Devil's Den, and the Peach Orchard. The 88th New York and the rest of the Irish Brigade took up position at the Wheatfield and held against several attacks from Confederate General James Longstreet's corps. The 88th and the rest of the brigade eventually broke, but were later considered heroes for holding for so long.

1864
By 1864, the 88th had fought in many battles and their men were depleted. They launched a recruiting campaign that year and gained 400 more recruits.

1865
At the end of the war in 1865, the men had mustered out. The 88th was then known as the "Wolves of the Army of the Potomac."

See also
List of New York Civil War units

Irish Brigade (U.S.)
Infantry 088
Irish regiments of the United States Army
1861 establishments in New York (state)
Military units and formations established in 1861
Military units and formations disestablished in 1865